LaunchGood is a crowdfunding platform focused on the Muslim community worldwide. LaunchGood went live in October 2013 and it raised more than $387.9 million from 1.2 million donors across 153 countries.

LaunchGood is one of a number of crowdfunding platforms for gathering money from the public, which circumvents traditional avenues of investment. Project creators choose a deadline and a minimum funding goal, and usually provide rewards or "perks" for contributors at various levels

The founders of LaunchGood are Chris Blauvelt, Amany Killawi and Omar Hamid. They are based out of Detroit, Michigan and Atlanta, Georgia.

Projects 

LaunchGood has been used to fundraise for several nationally recognized projects, including a campaign to help rebuild African-American churches destroyed by arson in the summer of 2015, and a campaign to fund the legal team of Adnan Syed (widely known from the podcast Serial) through a special appeal of his conviction. Each of these campaigns raised more than $100,000 through the platform. An October 2018 campaign to help pay for Jewish burials for the 11 victims of the Pittsburgh synagogue shooting, and the medical bills of survivors, raised its goal of $25,000 in six hours and went on to raise more than $200,000.

Awards 

LaunchGood has received multiple awards, including:
 Islamic Economy Award, Small & Medium Enterprises (SME)
 American Muslim Consumer Conference (AMCC), Entrepreneur Showcase

See also
 Civic crowdfunding
 Comparison of crowd funding services

References

External links 
 

Companies based in Detroit
Internet properties established in 2013
Crowdfunding platforms of the United States